Blanche Harbor is a natural harbour between Mono Island and Stirling Island  of the Treasury Islands archipelago, located n the Western Province of the Solomon Islands, at .

References

External links
  The Treasury Islands Campaign

Geography of the Solomon Islands
Western Province (Solomon Islands)